Looking Down the Yosemite Valley, California is an 1865 painting by the German-American painter Albert Bierstadt (1830–1902).

It was Bierstadt's first large-scale Yosemite picture, a subject for which he would become well known. It presents a view of one of America's most scenic spots. Based on sketches made during a visit in 1863, Bierstadt paints the valley from a vantage point just above the Merced River, looking due west with the prospect framed by El Capitan on the right, and Sentinel Rock on the left; the spire of Middle Cathedral Rock is visible in the distance.

References

External links 
American Paradise: The World of the Hudson River School, an exhibition catalog from The Metropolitan Museum of Art (fully available online as PDF), which contains material on this painting (see index)
Looking Down the Yosemite Valley, California Picturing America : teachers resource book

1865 paintings
Paintings by Albert Bierstadt
Paintings in Alabama